XEETCH-AM (La Voz de los Tres Ríos – "The Voice of the Three Rivers") is an indigenous community radio station that broadcasts in Spanish, Mayo, Yaqui and Guarijio from Etchojoa in the Mexican state of Sonora. 
It is run by the Cultural Indigenist Broadcasting System (SRCI) of the National Commission for the Development of Indigenous Peoples (CDI).

History
XEETCH was permitted in 1996. It originally broadcast on 1130 kHz.

External links
XEETCH website

References

Radio stations in Sonora
Sistema de Radiodifusoras Culturales Indígenas
Mayo people
Yaqui culture
Radio stations established in 1996
Daytime-only radio stations in Mexico